Sir George Borg MBE  (23 April 1887 – 29 June 1954) was a Maltese judge and politician. He was Chief Justice of Malta between 1940 and 1952.

Borg was educated at the universities of Malta and Catania. He became a solicitor in 1907 and was called to the bar in 1916. In 1932, he was elected to the Maltese Senate as a member of the Constitutional Party, and became a leader of the party after Lord Strickland's death in 1940.

Borg was appointed Chief Justice of Malta in 1940 and held the office until his retirement in 1952.

He was knighted by George VI when the King visited Malta in 1942. He also received, on behalf of the Maltese people, the George Cross that was presented to the island nation in honour of their defence during the Siege of Malta in the Second World War.

For several years, Borg was also editor of The Malta Herald. He died in Valletta in 1954.

References

1887 births
1954 deaths
People from Valletta
Chief justices of Malta
Leaders of political parties in Malta

Maltese knights
Crown Colony of Malta judges
20th-century Maltese politicians